Junior Etémé Mbatama (born 21 November 1992) is a Cameroonian footballer, who plays as a midfielder.

External links

1992 births
Living people
Cameroonian footballers
Association football midfielders
Cameroonian expatriate footballers
Expatriate footballers in France
Expatriate footballers in Slovenia
Cameroonian expatriate sportspeople in Slovenia
NK Olimpija Ljubljana (2005) players
Cameroon youth international footballers